The 2017 RS:X World Championships was held in Enoshima, Japan between September 16 and September 23.

Medalists

References

2017
RS:X World Championships